Nataliya Zolotukhina (born 4 January 1985 in Kharkiv, in the Ukrainian SSR of the Soviet Union) is a female hammer thrower from Ukraine. Her personal best throw is 70.30 metres, achieved in May 2010 in Yalta. She competed at the 2016 Summer Olympics.

Achievements

References

External links

1985 births
Living people
Ukrainian female hammer throwers
Athletes (track and field) at the 2016 Summer Olympics
Olympic athletes of Ukraine
World Athletics Championships athletes for Ukraine
Sportspeople from Kharkiv
21st-century Ukrainian women